Christian Hansen Arhoff (26 January 1893 in Horsens – 9 August 1973) was a Danish stage and film actor. Arhoff joined the National Socialist Workers' Party of Denmark in 1941.

Selected filmography

Talende film - 1923
Kraft og skønhed - 1928
Kys, klap og kommers - 1929
Højt paa en kvist - 1929
Fare på færde - 1930
Pas paa pigerne - 1930
Han, hun og Hamlet - 1932
Med fuld musik - 1933
Så til søs - 1933
Københavnere - 1933
 Flight from the Millions - 1934
Skaf en sensation - 1934
Rasmines bryllup - 1935
Prisoner Number One - 1935
Sjette trækning - 1936
Cocktail - 1937
Flådens blå matroser - 1937
Under byens tage - 1938
En lille tilfældighed - 1939
Sommerglæder - 1940
I de gode gamle dage - 1940
Tag det som en mand - 1941
Ballade i Nyhavn - 1942
Baby på eventyr - 1942
Moster fra Mols - 1943
Bedstemor går amok - 1944
Lev livet let - 1944
Panik i familien - 1945
Mens sagføreren sover - 1945
Den stjålne minister - 1949
Lynfotografen - 1950
Lån mig din kone - 1957
Pigen og vandpytten - 1958
Mor skal giftes - 1958
Vagabonderne på Bakkegården - 1958
Vi er allesammen tossede - 1959
Kærlighedens melodi - 1959
Far til fire på Bornholm - 1959
Det skete på Møllegården - 1960
Den grønne elevator - 1961
Min kone fra Paris - 1961
Soldaterkammerater på efterårsmanøvre - 1961
Prinsesse for en dag - 1962
Der brænder en ild - 1962
Don Olsen kommer til byen - 1964
Kampen om Næsbygaard - 1964
Næsbygaards arving - 1965
Krybskytterne på Næsbygaard - 1966
Mig og min lillebror - 1967
Brødrene på Uglegården - 1967
Lille mand, pas på! - 1968
De røde heste - 1968
Mig og min lillebror og storsmuglerne - 1968
Mig og min lillebror og Bølle - 1969
Og så er der bal bagefter - 1970

References

External links

1893 births
1973 deaths
People from Horsens
Danish Nazis
Danish male stage actors
Danish male film actors
Danish male silent film actors
20th-century Danish male actors